Aube is a French department in the Grand Est region of north-eastern France. As with sixty departments in France, this department is named after a river: the Aube. With 310,242 inhabitants (2019), Aube is the 74th department in terms of population. The inhabitants of the department are known as Aubois or Auboises.

The department was constituted as it is today by a decree of the National Assembly of 15 January 1790.

Geography

Location 

The Aube department is located in the south-west side of the Grand Est region. It borders the departments of Marne in the north (about 130 km long), Haute-Marne to the east (about 100 km long), Côte-d'Or in the south-east (about 45 km long), Yonne in the south-west (about 175 km long), and Seine-et-Marne in the west (about 45 km long).

Subregions of Aube 

Within the department regions of natural or traditional countryside can be identified as follows:
 northwest quarter: Champagne crayeuse (chalky Champagne)
 northwestern tip: the Nogentais
 southwest of Troyes: the Othe region
 to the south: le Chaourçois
 to the northeast: the Briennois
 to the east: the Barrois
 between Troyes and Barrois: Champagne wetlands

Communes of Aube 

Aube is divided into 431 communes totalling 310,242 inhabitants (2019). The most populous commune is the prefecture Troyes. As of 2019, there are 5 communes with more than 10,000 inhabitants:

All of those communes, except Romilly-sur-Seine, are part of the agglomeration of Troyes.

Topography and geology

Hydrography 

There are 23 rivers throughout the department, the four main rivers being the Seine, the Aube (tributary of the Seine), the Armance (tributary of the Armançon), and the Vanne (a tributary of the Yonne).

Forests and lakes 

The department has 140,000 hectares of forests.

Located in the Community of communes of Forests, lakes, and lands in Champagne, the Orient Forest Regional Natural Park was one of the first natural parks created in France.

In the same place, there is the Orient Lake and the Amance and Temple lakes where fishing, recreational water sports, and bathing are available. Each lake specialises in one or more of these activities.

Climate 
The climate is moderate without intense cold or excessive heat which represents a climate similar to continental and oceanic.

Between 1950 and 1985 the average annual temperature recorded in the department was 10.1 °C which is equivalent to the Paris basin and the cities of north-eastern France. The average sunshine hours per year is 1771.

Average annual rainfall is quite high (653.4 mm over 115 days of rain). In general there is more rain in autumn than in winter but rainfall is highest during spring. In contrast summer is the season when rainfall is lowest. There is, however, more rain in the south-east than the north-west.

Snow is relatively infrequent. Prevailing wind is from the west.

Channels of communication and transport

Road network 
The department has 150 km of autoroutes, 33 km of national roads, 4,517 km of departmental roads and 2,116 km of local roads.

Communal transport 
In the Agglomeration of Troyes TCAT (Transport for the Communes of Troyes) provides a transport network between communes. Unlike many networks that are provided by other operators, the agglomeration community of the city is the owner of the company. The network currently serves eleven communes including two outside the Troyes agglomeration. Other cities, including Romilly-sur-Seine, have no transport network.

Aube also has intercity transport networks. 21 regular bus routes are operated between the major cities of the department. The use of these lines is entrusted to private coaches: Transdev – The Carriers of Aube has 15 routes, Keolis Sud Lorraine has 4 routes, Procars Champagne has 2 routes, Autocars Bardy has one route.

Rail network 

Five railway stations are currently in operation. These are: Nogent-sur-Seine, Romilly-sur-Seine, Troyes, Vendeuvre-sur-Barse, Bar-sur-Aube.

Aube does not have a strong rail coverage. Only one main non-electrified line passes through Aube – the line that connects Paris-Est to Mulhouse.

Navigable waterways 
The department has 34.8 km of navigable waterways. The city of Nogent-sur-Seine has two river ports for grain.

History

Early history 
The first inhabitants of Aube were the Tricasses and Lingones with a substantial human settlement around the year 400 BC.

Saints Potentian and Savinian, Greek priests from Samos, came to preach the gospel from the middle of the 3rd century. Saint Patroclus was one of the first martyrs of the new faith in the year 259. Shortly after Saint Jule and some notables of the city of Tricasses also suffered martyrdom. Nevertheless, as elsewhere, the Christian community became large enough to accommodate a bishop. Saint Amateur was the first in 340. In the year 286 the Bagaudae ravaged the land which forms Aube. Emperor Julian came to Troyes with his army and rescued it.

The territory making up Aube was first attached to France in 843, following the Treaty of Verdun.

The 12th century and the monasteries 

Two important monasteries were founded in the department: one at Clairvaux in 1114, created by Bernard of Clairvaux, the other was the Abbey of the Paraclete near Nogent-sur-Seine, by his illustrious rival, Pierre Abélard and of which Héloïse d'Argenteuil was the first abbess. Bernard of Clairvaux was noted for his eloquence at the Council of Troyes and his preaching of the Second Crusade which had no result and whose outcome was disastrous.

The reunion of Champagne with the kingdom of France was finalised in 1361. Yet people wanted absolutely the incorporation of Champagne but in 1328 King Philip VI gave the city of Bar-sur-Seine to Philippe de Croy. The inhabitants, however, ransomed him to return it to the king on the condition that it become inalienable.

Definitive reunion with Kingdom of France 
The decree of the National Assembly of 15 January 1790 formally established the department of Aube. Its first president was Augustin-Henri-Marie Picot and his first deputy was Louis Antoine Joseph Robin. Jacques Claude Beugnot was elected Attorney-General and also MP.

The 19th century marked the emergence of the Hosiery business in the department.

After the victory of the allies in the Battle of Waterloo on 18 June 1815, the department was occupied by Russian troops from June 1815 to November 1818.

In 1911 following the revolt of the vineyards of Champagne large Riots broke out in the department. The consequences of this were tragic because the clashes resulted in dozens of injuries.

In 1919, a decree allowed Aube department to produce champagne for the first time.

In 1932 Turkish president Mustafa Kemal Atatürk visited Aube and signed a friendship treaty with France there on 4 July 1938.

Heraldry

Politics and administration

General Council 
The General Council of Aube is located in Troyes. Its president has been DVD Senator Philippe Adnot since July 1990. It includes the 34 councillors of the 17 cantons of Aube. Of these, 32 are from the Right (mainly the UMP), the others are from the Miscellaneous left. Currently the budget of the General Council is €329.8 million. Its main mission and expenditure on social activities and health.

Politics 

Aube returns three Deputies to the National Assembly, two of whom are from The Republicans (LR), and two Senators: one UMP and one right-wing independent.

Presidential elections 2nd round

Current National Assembly Representatives

Demography 

Aube is inhabited by 310,242 people with more than a third (137,500 inhabitants) living in the Troyes agglomeration (2019).

Demographic change 
In 2017, the department had 310,020 inhabitants.

Distribution of age groups 
Percentage Distribution of Age Groups in Aube Department in 2017

Source: INSEE

Breakdown of population by socio-professional categories

Economy

General 
The economy of Aube has focused on the textile industry since the 19th century. This sector is now in crisis due to the department being in an area of real economic change.

In 2017, the departmental workforce totalled 137,774 with 114,530 persons in employment and 23,244 people unemployed. Men accounted for 51.4% of the active population and women 48.6%.

The Aube department has a high rate of feminization in employment. Nearly half of people with active jobs (48.1% in 2017) are women. The main areas affected by the feminization are trade, transport, textiles, utilities, education, and health. Women are slightly more affected than men by unemployment (51.3% of the unemployed in 2017). This is mainly due to layoffs in the textile sector.

Employment by sector 
Distribution of Employment by Industry sector (2015)

Main economic sectors

Industry

Tourism

Agriculture 

The utilized agricultural area is 379,720 hectares. Aube is the largest producer of hemp; the 2nd largest producer of champagne, cabbage for sauerkraut, medicinal poppies, and alfalfa; the 6th largest producer of potatoes; the 8th largest producer of cereals; and the 9th largest producer of beet in France.

Population and society

Education

Primary and secondary 
In 2010 elementary and secondary education consisted of:
 11,568 students in kindergarten across 136 schools (including 1 private);
 18,465 students in primary school across 255 schools (including 14 private);
 12,311 students in college across 34 institutions (including 9 private);
 5,199 students in schools of general education across 10 institutions (including 3 private);
 2,666 students in vocational high school across 10 institutions (including 3 private).

Higher education 
According to the latest census of the academic inspectorate of Aube in 2009 the department has 8,794 students in higher education.

List of Universities and Higher Educational Schools

Public Schools
 University of Technology of Troyes (UTT)
 Institute of Technology of Troyes (University of Reims Champagne-Ardenne)
 Faculty (University of Reims Champagne-Ardenne)
 Institute for Heritage Skills (IUMP)
 Institute for Teacher Training (IUFM)
 Institute for Nursing Education (IFSI of Troyes/DE IDE)
 Preparatory classes for Higher Education (CPGE) scientific and economic
 Graduate School for Applied Arts in Troyes
 National Conservatory of Music in Troyes

Private Schools
 Graduate School of Commerce in Troyes
 Supinfo

Health

Sports 

There are 580 clubs and sports associations in the Aube department. The main ones are:
 ES Troyes AC: soccer club in the French Ligue 1;
 ETAC Handball: Handball Club at National Level 3;
 Union Sportive de Sainte Maure Troyes Handball: Women's handball club at National Level 1;
 Pygargues of Troyes: american football club in Division 2;
 PLAVB (Troyes): volleyball club at Regional one;
 SUMA (Troyes): Motoball club of France (one of the most successful) moved to elite since the 1930s;
 Troyes roller hockey: roller hockey club playing at National Level 2;
 Espadons (Swordfish )(Troyes): baseball club playing at Regional Level 1;
 Romilly Association for Sports 10: which includes multiple sections.

Media

Radio 
At Troyes there are three independent local radio stations:
 Radio Latitude: that broadcasts programming focused on the dance floor. This was the first local radio station in the department. It broadcasts from Troyes, Romilly-sur-Seine, and Vendeuvre-sur-Barse
 Theme Radio: community radio broadcasting music and information flashes
 Troyes Campus radio: rock music oriented radio and sometimes rap

At Romilly-sur-Seine, in addition to Latitude Radio, there is a local independent radio broadcaster: Radio Aube et Seine.

French Christian Radio (RCF) Aube is located in the department.

Television 
 Canal 32: television network with a local Troyes and department station
 France 3 Aube (France 3 Lorraine Champagne-Ardenne)

Daily newspapers

Justice 
All Aube jurisdictions are located in Troyes. The city has a Tribunal d'instance and a High Court, a commercial court and an Employment Tribunal for civil and criminal jurisdictions. There is also a Correctional court and a Juvenile court.

Appeals, however, are passed to the Court of Appeal in Reims.

Waste management 
Aube currently has two storage facilities for radioactive waste:
 Storage Centre for Very Low Activity Waste (CSTFA)
 Storage Centre for Low and Medium Activity Waste (CSFMA)

Culture and heritage

Cultural venues

Theatres and concerts 
 The Cube – in the Parc des Expositions in Troyes
 Champagne Theatre
 Théâtre of la Madeleine
 Argence space

Cinemas 
The four main theatres are:
 Ciné City in Troyes
 Vagabond in Bar-sur-Aube
 Lumière in Nogent-sur-Seine
 Cinema Eden in Romilly-sur-Seine

Cultural festivities 
 Festival in Othe
 Aube Templiers 2012 event

Gastronomy 

 Andouillette from Troyes
 Barberey cheese
 Cacibel liqueur
 Montgueux champagne
 Chaource cheese
 Chocolate from Jacquot (Cémoi group)
 Sauerkraut from Brienne-le-Château
 Cider from Othe country
 Prunelle de Troyes liqueur
 Rosé des Riceys wine

Monuments and tourist sites 

The Aube has 365 historical monuments of which 144 are classified, and 221 are enrolled.

Castles 
 La Motte-Tilly Castle
 Bligny Castle
 Droupt-Saint-Basle Castle
 Barberey-Saint-Sulpice Castle
 Brienne-le-Château Castle

Museums 

 Napoleon Museum (Brienne-le-Château)
 Museum Hugues de Payens (Payns)
 Resistance Museum (Mussy-sur-Seine)
 Cider Museum (Eaux-Puiseaux)
 Museum of the old Champagne malt house (La Chapelle-Saint-Luc)
 Cheese Museum (Chaource)
 Museum of crystals – Centre Mazzolay (Bayel)
 Eco-Museum of the Orient Forest (Brienne-la-Vieille)
 House of Tools and Work Reflections (Troyes)
 Museum of Vauluisant (Troyes)
 Museum of peasant history (Champcharme)
 Museum of peasant memory (Estissac)
 Living Museum of Romilly hosiery (Romilly-sur-Seine)
 The Folk Art Museum (Droupt-Saint-Basle)
 Renoir Workshop (Essoyes)
 Museum of Modern Art (Troyes)
 Loukine Museum (Arsonval)
 Paul Dubois-Alfred Boucher Museum (Nogent-sur-Seine)
 Saint-Loup Museum (Troyes)
 Apothecary of the Hotel-Dieu-le-Comte (Troyes)
 Michel Marcu Museum of automata (Lusigny-sur-Barse)
 Di Marco Museum (Troyes)
 Museum of dolls of yesteryear and cooperage (Maisons-lès-Chaource)
 Museum of the Simple Past (Crésantignes)
 Aube Educational History Museum
 Museum of news design in the press (Troyes)

Other historic sites 

 Clairvaux Abbey
 Basilica of St. Urbain, Troyes
 Abbey of Saint-Loup of Troyes
 Monastery Notre-Dame of Saint Espérance
 Hotel of Marisy
 Hotel de Ville in Troyes
 Hotel of the prefecture of Aube

Tourist places 
 Orient Forest Regional Natural Park
 Orient Lake
 Amance and Temple Lakes
 Nigloland: amusement park located at Dolancourt

Notable people linked to the department 

 Chrétien de Troyes, writer
 Urbain IV, Pope
 Georges Jacques Danton, Revolutionary
 Martin-Pierre Gauthier, Architect
 Jacques-Nicolas Paillot de Montabert, Painter
 Henri Gambey, Inventor
 Alexandre Du Sommerard, Archeologist
 Louis Jacques Thénard, Chemist
 Sylvain Charles Valée, Marshal of France
 Jacques Claude Beugnot, Politician
 Nicolas Desmarest, Geologist
 Pierre-Jean Grosley, Historian
 Edmé Boursault, Man of Letters
 Jean de Brienne, King of Jerusalem
 Jules Guyot, Physician, oenologist (1807–1872)
 Charles Baltet, Horticulturalist (1830–1908)
 Gabriel Bonvalot, Explorer (1853–1933)
 Gaston Bachelard, Philosopher and professor at Bar-sur-Aube
 Gaston Cheq, Leader of the revolt of the wine-growers in 1911
 Olivier Messiaen, Composer, Organist, ornithologist, Fuligny, Aube, 1928–1931

See also 
 Cantons of the Aube department
 Communes of the Aube department
 Arrondissements of the Aube department

Notes

References

External links 

  Prefecture website
  Departmental Council website

  
 Official website for Tourism for Aube 
 Official website for Tourism in Aube for Tablets and smartphones 
 Departmental Archives
 Official website of discovery for Aube 
 Vitrail website for Aube  

 
1790 establishments in France
Articles which contain graphical timelines
Departments of Grand Est
States and territories established in 1790